Mark Thomas Bridges, 3rd Baron Bridges, KCVO (born 25 July 1954), is the solicitor to, among others, the Princess Royal, the Duchy of Lancaster, and formerly Queen Elizabeth II. 

He is the son of Thomas Edward Bridges, 2nd Baron Bridges. He was educated at Eton College, Berkshire, and at Corpus Christi College, Cambridge. He became the 3rd Baron Bridges on the death of his father in 2017.

He currently works for Farrer & Co, a solicitor's firm in London which was founded by his grandmother's great-grandfather. He is married to Angela Margaret Collinson and has four children of whom three living.

Bridges was appointed Commander of the Royal Victorian Order (CVO) in the 2012 New Year Honours for his work as personal solicitor to the Queen, being advanced Knight Commander of the Royal Victorian Order in the 2019 New Year Honours.

In 2022, Bridges was elected Prime Warden of the Worshipful Company of Goldsmiths.

References

1954 births
Living people
English solicitors
3
Knights Commander of the Royal Victorian Order
People educated at Eton College
Alumni of Corpus Christi College, Cambridge